Song of Co-Aklan is the sixth and final solo album by the Irish singer / songwriter Cathal Coughlan. It was recorded in London just before the COVID-19 pandemic and released to critical acclaim in 2021. The album was preceded by a limited edition cover of Van Morrisson's "Come Here My Love."

The lyrics are written from the point of view of Coughlan's alter-ego Co Aklan. According to critic Neil Hodge the listener is drawn in "from the opening bars of the albums title track....into the world of Co Aklan [with] perfectly obtuse lyrics with a deeper meaning, alongside Coughlan’s welcoming dynamic vocal."

The album was widely praised on release and is considered the peak of his solo career.

Personnel
Cathal Coughlan – vocals

References

External links
 bandcamp 

2019 albums
Cathal Coughlan